Ernest is a masculine given name.

Ernest may also refer to:

 Ernest, Pennsylvania, United States, a borough
 Ernest Township, Dade County, Missouri, United States
 Ernest Airlines, a defunct Italian airline
 Ernest River, Western Australia
 Cyclone Ernest, two Indian Ocean tropical cyclones
 John Ernest (1922-1994), American abstract artist and mathematician
 Ian Ernest (born 1954), Mauritian Anglican Archbishop of the Indian Ocean and Bishop of Mauritius 
 Ernest (musician), American country music artist